The Path of Progress National Heritage Tour Route is a federally designated National Heritage Area, arranged as an automobile tour route through nine counties in southwestern Pennsylvania.

References

External links 

 Path of Progress National Heritage Area at the National Park Service

National Heritage Areas of the United States
Protected areas of Pennsylvania